is a Japanese professional footballer who plays as a defender for Hong Kong Premier League club Southern.

Career

Australia

Accepting a contract with Wollongong Wolves in late 2015 for his performances with Wollongong United in the Illawarra Premier League, Kawase decided to further his career in Australia due to the physicality of the footballers there as well as its level, setting a league title as his target with United.  However, the Wolves were relegated at the end of the 2016 season  and the Japanese defender had to leave despite participating in most of their fixtures, claiming to have become more erudite as a footballer.

Philippines

Bolstering Ceres for the 2017 Philippines Football League and AFC Cup, the Takushoku University alumnus started for the Busmen in their historic two-legged 3-2 win over Home United at the 2017 AFC Cup to become ASEAN Zone champions.

Malaysia

Was announced as one of UiTM's imports for the 2018 Malaysia Premier League with Lucas Pugh and Dechi Marcel N'Guessan.

Hong Kong
Kota joined Hong Kong Premier League club Dreams FC on 21 January 2019.

On 26 June 2019, Kawase moved to fellow Hong Kong club Southern.

On 28 April 2020, Southern announced an agreement with Kawase to extend his contract.

References

External links 
 
 
 
 SportsTG Profile

Association football defenders
1992 births
Living people
Takushoku University alumni
Japanese footballers
Japanese expatriate footballers
Japanese expatriate sportspeople in Malaysia
Expatriate footballers in the Philippines
Expatriate soccer players in Australia
Malaysia Premier League players
Expatriate footballers in Malaysia
UiTM FC players
Japanese expatriate sportspeople in the Philippines
Wollongong Wolves FC players
Bonnyrigg White Eagles FC players
Hong Kong Premier League players
Dreams Sports Club players
Southern District FC players
Japanese expatriates in Hong Kong
Wollongong United FC players